Phi Ursae Majoris, Latinized from φ Ursae Majoris, is binary star system in the northern constellation of Ursa Major. It is white-hued and is visible to the naked eye with a combined apparent visual magnitude of +4.60; the primary is magnitude 5.28 while the secondary is magnitude 5.39.

As of 2017, the components had an angular separation of  along a position angle of 304°. They are orbiting each other with a period of 105.4 years and eccentricity of 0.44. Both of components are A-type subgiant stars with a stellar classification of A3 IV.

Phi Ursae Majoris is moving through the galaxy at a speed of 21.6 km/s relative to the Sun. Its projected galactic orbit carries it between 24,000 and 46,000 light-years from the center of the galaxy.

Naming
With τ, h, υ, θ, e, and f, it composed the Arabic asterism Sarīr Banāt al-Na'sh, the Throne of the daughters of Na'sh, and Al-Haud, the Pond. According to the catalogue of stars in the Technical Memorandum 33-507 - A Reduced Star Catalog Containing 537 Named Stars, Al-Haud were the title for seven stars: f as Alhaud I, τ as Alhaud II, e as Alhaud III, h as Alhaud IV, θ as Alhaud V, υ as Alhaud VI and this star (φ) as Alhaud VII.

References

A-type subgiants
Binary stars

Ursa Major (constellation)
Ursae Majoris, Phi
Ursae Majoris, 30
Durchmusterung objects
085235
048402
3894
Alhaud VII